The 1974 ABC Under-18 Championship was the third edition of the Asian Basketball Confederation (ABC)'s junior championship. The games were held at Manila, Philippines from December 1–15, 1974.

The  successfully defended their championship by sweeping all of their assignments, blasting , 89-79, in the final day, en route to their third title.

Preliminary round

Final round

Classification 5th–9th

Championship

Final standing

Awards

References

FIBA Asia Under-18 Championship
1974 in Asian basketball
1974 in Philippine basketball
International basketball competitions hosted by the Philippines
December 1974 sports events in Asia